Rasstegai is a type of Russian pirog with a hole in the top.

History and etymology 
The dish was very popular in Tsarist Russia.

Another version: in Moscow, in the gypsy choir, the beautiful Katya sang very well the Russian song "Sarafanchik-rasstegaychik"; in honor of Katya, rasstegai became very popular meal in taverns in Moscow.

Information
The filling usually contains fish, but may also contain meat, liver, rice or mushrooms.

The hole of rasstegai is used to add broth to the stuffing.

In literature
The dish is mentioned in Nikolai Gogol's Dead Souls and Vladimir Gilyarovsky's Moscow and the Muscovites.

References

Russian cuisine
Russian pastries